Louis Bury (born 10 July 1995) is a French professional footballer who plays as a defender.

Career
Bury joined the youth academy of Pau FC at the age of 13, and joined their senior team in 2016. Bury made his professional debut with Pau in a 4–1 Ligue 2 loss to AC Ajaccio on 5 January 2021.

References

External links
 

1995 births
Living people
Sportspeople from Pau, Pyrénées-Atlantiques
Association football defenders
French footballers
Pau FC players
Ligue 2 players
Championnat National players
Championnat National 2 players
Championnat National 3 players
Footballers from Nouvelle-Aquitaine